Ferdinand Bernhard Joseph "Ferd" Grapperhaus (born 8 November 1959) is a Dutch politician who served as Minister of Justice and Security in the Third Rutte cabinet from 26 October 2017 until 10 January 2022. He is a member of the Christian Democratic Appeal (CDA).

Family and education
Grapperhaus was born in Amsterdam. Grapperhaus went to the secondary school Aloysius College in The Hague in between 1971 and 1977. He studied Dutch law at the University of Amsterdam where he obtained an LLM degree in constitutional law in 1984. In 1995, Grapperhaus was awarded a PhD degree in labour law under the supervision of Paul F. van der Heijden.

Career

Professional life
A jurist by occupation, he worked as a lawyer for the law firm Schut & Grosheide from 1984 until 1998 when he became a partner at the law firm Loeff Claeys Verbeke. In 1999, part of Loeff Claeys Verbeke merged with Allen & Overy (the other part continuing as Loyens & Loeff), and Grapperhaus became partner at the A&O branch in Amsterdam. He served as managing partner for the Amsterdam branch from 1 February 2015 until 1 September 2017. Grapperhaus became a professor of labour law at the Maastricht University on 1 January 2005.

Politics
He served as a member of the Social and Economic Council 1 April 2006 until 22 May 2015. Following the election of 2017 Grapperhaus was asked to become Minister of Justice and Security in the Third Rutte cabinet. Grapperhaus accepted and resigned as a professor the same day he took office as the new Minister of Justice and Security on 26 October 2017. During his tenure, the name of his ministry was changed from "Ministry of Security and Justice" to "Ministry of Justice and Security", a move costing €2,000,000.

Controversy
As a response to parliamentary questions following the Argos documentary 'Shards of glass and dark rituals', Grapperhaus said on 27 August 2020 that there would be 'no independent investigation into Ritual Abuse' of children in The Netherlands. The Green Left, the Socialist Party and the Labour Party criticised the minister for his decision. On the same day, Grapperhaus responded to public controversy when news media reported about the lack of social distancing at his own wedding amid the COVID-19 pandemic in the Netherlands. He agreed to pay a 390 euro fine.
On the 26th of June 2021, Grapperhuis sang a made up song on Dutch TV about throwing away protective face masks just as a further wave of infections of Covid 19 in the Netherlands was taking hold. Two weeks later there were 10000 cases per day recorded.
 On 13 October, the House of Representatives (Netherlands) approved a motion in which the PvdA, GL and the SP requested that an independent investigation be conducted into the nature and extent of "organized sadistic abuse of children", bypassing Grapperhaus' original refusal to investigate.

References

External links
Official

  Mr.Dr. F.B.J. (Ferdinand) Grapperhaus Parlement & Politiek

|-

1959 births
Living people
Allen & Overy people
Christian Democratic Appeal politicians
Lawyers from Amsterdam
Academic staff of Maastricht University
Ministers of Defence of the Netherlands
Ministers of Justice of the Netherlands
Members of the Social and Economic Council
Labour law scholars
Politicians from Amsterdam
University of Amsterdam alumni
20th-century Dutch civil servants
20th-century Dutch jurists
20th-century Dutch lawyers
20th-century Dutch male writers
21st-century Dutch civil servants
21st-century Dutch educators
21st-century Dutch jurists
21st-century Dutch lawyers
21st-century Dutch male writers
21st-century Dutch politicians